The Royal Ordnance Factory, ROF Patricroft, was an engineering factory was classified as a Medium Machine Shop. It was located in Patricroft, near the town of Eccles, in the City of Salford, Greater Manchester, England, adjacent to both the Liverpool & Manchester Railway and the Bridgewater Canal.

The Ministry of Supply took over an existing engineering works, The Bridgewater Foundry, founded by James Nasmyth and Holbrook Gaskell, owned by the locomotive manufacturer Nasmyth, Gaskell & Company. They had ceased manufacturing locomotives in 1938 but continued, on a smaller scale, making steam hammers and machine tools. The company ceased trading in November 1940.

The Ministry of Supply took over the works, on 1 June 1940, to convert it into a Royal Ordnance Factory. Staff from the Royal Arsenal, Woolwich, acted as agents for the Ministry of Supply. It reopened as an ROF in February 1941.

The site consisted of a square mill-like building, known as The Tower, and various surrounding buildings including a machine shop, a foundry and a blacksmith's shop. It remained in use as an ROF until the late 1980s.

War time production
ROF Patricroft was opened during World War II to supplement the work of the Royal Arsenal, Woolwich. Some 3,000 men and women were employed at ROF Patricroft during the war.

Parts for the Bofors 40 mm gun were manufactured. Other buildings on the site were used to fabricate welded parts, particularly oil tanks to enable steam locomotives to run on oil instead of coal.

Closure
ROF Patricroft was privatised in 1984 along with a number of Royal Ordnance Factories to become a constituent part of Royal Ordnance Plc; which was later bought in April 1987 by British Aerospace (BAe). Shortly afterwards, in 1988 and 1989, respectively,  both the Royal Small Arms Factory at Enfield Lock and the Patricroft site were closed down and sold off for redevelopment. Patricroft was also at the forefront of manufacturing rocket motors for missiles such as such as ALARM, Harpoon, Sea Wolf and Sea Dart. Patricroft had developed advanced machining to cover many aspects of ammunition and missile systems.

Patricroft also had capabilities in advanced flow forming, Electro Slag Refining (ESR) and vertical forging of Chieftain tank gun barrels.

The former Royal Ordnance Factory is now part of a business and technology centre, Nasmyth Business Centre.

References
 Cantrell, John, (2005). Nasmyth, Wilson & Co.: Patricroft Locomotive Builders. Stroud: Tempus Publishing .
 Hay, Ian, (1949). R.O.F.: The story of the Royal Ordnance Factories, 1939 - 48. London: His Majesty's Stationery Office.

See also
List of Royal Ordnance Factories
Royal Ordnance Factory
Link to 1967 picture of the Tower. http://www.transportarchive.org.uk/printobject.php?rnum=T1654&searchitem=factory&mtv=T1&pnum=1

Buildings and structures in the City of Salford
Eccles, Greater Manchester
Economy of Greater Manchester
Patricroft
Patricroft